Damien Bush (born 19 May 1968) is an English cricketer. He played sixteen first-class matches for Cambridge University Cricket Club between 1989 and 1991.

See also
 List of Cambridge University Cricket Club players

References

External links
 

1968 births
Living people
English cricketers
Cambridge University cricketers
Sportspeople from Solihull